The Wisconsin Institute for Torah Study (WITS), also known as Yeshivas Ohr Yechezkel, is an Orthodox Jewish school for boys (yeshiva) in Milwaukee, Wisconsin, and an affiliate of Yeshivas Chofetz Chaim.

History 

WITS was founded in 1980 by Rabbi Yehuda Cheplowitz, Rabbi Moshe Dov Harris, and Rabbi Raphael Wachsman. 

In 1984, WITS moved from Whitefish Bay, Wisconsin to its current facility, a Tudor-style mansion in Milwaukee’s Upper East Side overlooking Lake Michigan. The mansion was built by the lumber baron Henry M. Thompson in 1913 and designed by Alexander C. Eschweiler.  It had previously been home to St. Mary's Ecumenical Retreat and Conference Center, a convent and retreat center for Catholic and Episcopalian nuns.

In the late 1980s, David Draiman, frontman for the rock band Disturbed, briefly attended the high school.

In 1995, WITS sought to expand the size of its facilities three-fold by building a “30,000-square-foot addition, which [would] include a gym, classrooms, offices, a dining room and worship hall,” but neighbors voiced concerns about zoning and feared the expansion would tarnish the historic character of the building and the neighborhood.

After changes were made to the plans ensuring that the historic look of the building would be maintained, including building the new section out of similarly-colored limestone blocks as the old historic building, and ensuring that the new construction would not be visible from the street, Milwaukee’s Historic Preservation Commission approved the expansion, which was opened in March 2000. Legal expenses and extra costs to reinforce the ground beneath the building, however, reduced the overall size of the project to 23,000 square feet, which, in the end, included “nine new classrooms, a state-of-the-art computer lab and a science lab,” but no gymnasium as originally planned.

On June 17, 2010, a small electrical fire on the third floor of the new building caused an evacuation of the building and minor damage. The building has since been renovated and returned to full use.

Rabbi Raphael Wachsman, z"l, one of the founding deans, died on February 6, 2016.

Academics 

WITS is divided into two programs: a high school program and a post-high-school Beis Medrash program.

The high school program includes both a rigorous Judaic studies curriculum, and a competitive college-preparatory secular curriculum. Beyond the classroom, the school emphasizes strong rebbi-student relationships, mentorships, personal development and good midos.

The Beis Medrash program offers three levels of "Iyun Shiurim" daily (in-depth Talmudic sermons), and focuses on strong rebbi-student relationships, mentorships with high school students, and continued personal development.

References

External links
School web site
Greatschools.com

Private high schools in Wisconsin
Modern Orthodox Jewish day schools in the United States